The South Side High School in the South Side Flats neighborhood of Pittsburgh, Pennsylvania, is a building from 1897. It was listed on the National Register of Historic Places in 1986.

In 1977, South High School won its only City Championship in Football, the first and only in any sport. The school was shut down on 14 August 2004; the building was sold as housing to Gregory Development in 2008 for $1.1 million.

References

School buildings on the National Register of Historic Places in Pennsylvania
Neoclassical architecture in Pennsylvania
School buildings completed in 1897
High schools in Pittsburgh
Pittsburgh History & Landmarks Foundation Historic Landmarks
National Register of Historic Places in Pittsburgh